Gehyra georgpotthasti is a species of web-toed gecko, found on several Melanesian and Polynesian islands.

Description
A large, stoutly built gecko. It has a brown color with five dark brown saddle patches between forelimbs and base of tail. The ventral side is light brown with a yellow hue. Iris is brown. The color can vary by showing yellow, reddish and olive elements. The tail has five to six dark bands, which are especially distinct in juveniles and less distinct on adults. Males grow larger than females and have precloacal-femoral pores. Like most geckos, they are oviparous, i.e. reproduce by laying eggs.

The diet includes bananas which is unusual for Gehyras.

Some specimens show green-coloured muscle tissue when the skin is damaged.

The species was described in 2012, as distinct from G. vorax.

Distribution
It is found in Loyalty Islands (New Caledonia), Vanuatu, and French Polynesia.

Habits
The species is generally arboreal and nocturnal, occupying habitats in rainforest and along beaches. Often found on coconut trees.

References

Gehyra
Reptiles of Oceania
Fauna of French Polynesia
Geckos of New Caledonia
Reptiles of Vanuatu
Reptiles described in 2012
Taxa named by Wolfgang Böhme (herpetologist)
Taxa named by Morris Flecks
Taxa named by Friedrich Wilhelm Henkel
Taxa named by Ivan Ineich
Taxa named by Andreas Schmitz